Transport Corporation of India Limited is an Indian logistics and supply chain management company headquartered in Gurugram, Haryana, India. It was founded in 1958 by Mr. Prabhu Dayal Agarwal at Kolkata, India. TCI has 1400+ offices all across India with 6000+ employeess.
The whole corporation is composed of eight divisions, namely: TCI Freight, TCI Express (formerly TCI XPS), TCI Supply Chain Solution, TCI Global, TCI Seaways and TCI Foundation.

TCI Group manages 11.5 mn sq. ft. of warehousing space and mainly caters to industries such as retail, pharmaceuticals, auto, hi-tech, cold chain, and consumer products.

Divisions
TCI Freight provides basic transportation facilities like full truck load, less than truck load, small consignment, over dimensional cargo all over India. Apart from road, the division also provides rail transportation using bulk rakes, containers, and wagons.

TCI Express (formerly TCI XPS) is an express cargo division of TCI Group. This division offers domestic and international courier services through road, rail and air with some value added services. TCI Express also provides e-commerce delivery service in India.

TCI Supply Chain Solutions provides supply chain consultancy, inbound logistics, in-plant stores & yard management, warehousing/distribution centre management and outbound logistics. Key industries catered by TCI SCS are auto, high-tech, telecommunications, retail & CP, cold chain and pharmaceuticals.

TCI Global is the global business division of TCI. It trades across all major South East Asian countries. TCI Global offers customs clearance, international inbound and outbound freight handling (air and sea), primary and secondary warehousing/redistribution, third party logistics, multimodal (air, surface and sea) services, ODC movements, mining logistics and project cargo.

TCI Seaways is equipped with 22338 containers and seven vessels (91880 DWT cumulative capacities). It provides ship management, liner/charter/agency activities, stevedoring/project handling, multi-modal and transportation services. Under domestic services, TCI Seaways does coastal shipping, and agency service, and under international services, break bulk, project cargo and containerized business. TCI Seaways caters to the coastal cargo requirements for transporting container and bulk cargo from ports on the west and east coasts of India to Port Blair in the Andaman and Nicobar Islands, and further distribution within the islands.

TCI Foundation is  the group's social arm, and fulfils corporate social responsibility. TCI Freight has been working in the areas of health, education, women's development, disability and disaster relief assistance.

Associate company
TCI Developers Ltd is the real estate arm of TCI Group, and was created to look into the development of commercial properties of TCI. These properties will be developed into office complexes, residential buildings, etc. depending on the best use of the property. It is also undertaking the development of large modern warehouses and logistics parks.

Joint ventures
Transystem TLI is a joint venture between TCI and Mitsui & Co Ltd, which is a logistics partner for Toyota Kirloskar Motors Ltd. in India.

TCI-CONCOR Multimodal Solutions Private Limited is a joint venture with Container Corporation of India (CONCOR) for bulk transport by rail and road.

Subsidiaries

 TCI Transportation Company Nigeria Limited
 TCI Global (HKG) Limited
 TCI Chatbot
 TCI Global Logistik Verwaltungs GmbH i.L. Eschborn
 TCI Global (Thailand) Co., Ltd.
 TCI Global (Malaysia) SDN. BHD.
 TCI Holdings SA&E Pte Ltd
 TCI Global Brazil Logistica Ltda
 TCI Global Holdings (Mauritius) Limited
 TCI Global (Singapore) Pte Ltd
 TCI Crystal Report
 TCI Holdings Asia Pacific Pte Ltd
 TCI Global Shanghai Company Limited
 PT TCI Global Indonesia
 TCI Prosperities Pune Ltd

References

Transport companies established in 1958
Transport companies of India
Companies based in Gurgaon
Logistics companies of India
Indian companies established in 1958
Indian trucking industry
1958 establishments in East Punjab